Banbridge Town Football Club is an intermediate football club from Northern Ireland playing in the NIFL Premier Intermediate League. The club, founded in 1947, hails from Banbridge, County Down and plays its home matches at Crystal Park. Club colours are red and black. In 2014, the club merged with Banbridge A.F.C. The 2016/17 season saw Banbridge Town’s reserve team win the South Down Development League.

The club was managed by Frankie Wilson from 2021 until his passing in 2022.

Current squad

Honours

Senior honours
Mid-Ulster Cup: 5
1948–49, 1949–50, 1958–59, 1973–74, 1979–80

Intermediate honours
Irish League B Division: 1
1955–56
Irish Intermediate Cup: 1
1985–86
George Wilson Cup: 1
1976–77
Louis Moore Cup: 2
1955–56, 1967–68
Bob Radcliffe Cup: 3
1980–81, 2010–11, 2018–19
Alan Wilson Memorial Cup: 1
1986–87

References

External links 
Banbridge Town FC Website

Association football clubs established in 1947
Association football clubs in Northern Ireland
Association football clubs in County Down
1947 establishments in Northern Ireland
NIFL Premier Intermediate League clubs
Town